Thymoites is a genus of comb-footed spiders that was first described by Eugen von Keyserling in 1884.

Species
 it contains ninety-four species, found in Central America, Asia, South America, the Caribbean, Europe, Africa, North America, and on Greenland:
T. aloitus Levi, 1964 – Brazil
T. amprus Levi, 1964 – Panama
T. anicus Levi, 1964 – Brazil
T. anserma Levi, 1964 – Colombia
T. banksi (Bryant, 1948) – Hispaniola
T. bellissimus (L. Koch, 1879) – Scandinavia, Russia (Europe to Far East), China
T. bocaina Rodrigues & Brescovit, 2015 – Brazil
T. bogus (Levi, 1959) – Panama
T. boneti (Levi, 1959) – Mexico
T. boquete (Levi, 1959) – Mexico to Panama
T. bradti (Levi, 1959) – Mexico
T. camano (Levi, 1957) – USA
T. camaqua Rodrigues & Brescovit, 2015 – Brazil
T. cancellatus Mello-Leitão, 1943 – Argentina
T. caracasanus (Simon, 1895) – Guatemala to Ecuador
T. chiapensis (Levi, 1959) – Mexico
T. chickeringi (Levi, 1959) – Panama
T. chikunii (Yoshida, 1988) – Japan
T. chopardi (Berland, 1920) – East Africa
T. confraternus (Banks, 1898) – Mexico to Peru
T. corus (Levi, 1959) – Mexico
T. crassipes Keyserling, 1884 (type) – Peru
T. cravilus Marques & Buckup, 1992 – Brazil
T. cristal Rodrigues & Brescovit, 2015 – Brazil
T. delicatulus (Levi, 1959) – Mexico to Venezuela
T. ebus Levi, 1964 – Brazil
T. elongatus Peng, Yin & Hu, 2008 – China
T. expulsus (Gertsch & Mulaik, 1936) – USA, Mexico, Cuba, Jamaica
T. gertrudae Müller & Heimer, 1990 – Colombia
T. gibbithorax (Simon, 1894) – Venezuela
T. guanicae (Petrunkevitch, 1930) – Mexico, Greater Antilles
T. hupingensis Gan & Peng, 2015 – China
T. ilhabela Rodrigues & Brescovit, 2015 – Brazil
T. illudens (Gertsch & Mulaik, 1936) – USA to Colombia
T. ilvan Levi, 1964 – Brazil
T. incachaca Levi, 1964 – Bolivia
T. indicatus (Banks, 1929) – Nicaragua to Panama
T. ipiranga Levi, 1964 – Brazil
T. iritus Levi, 1964 – Brazil
T. levii Gruia, 1973 – Cuba
T. lobifrons (Simon, 1894) – Venezuela
T. lori Levi, 1964 – Peru
T. luculentus (Simon, 1894) – Mexico to Panama, St. Vincent
T. machu Levi, 1967 – Peru
T. maderae (Gertsch & Archer, 1942) – USA to Panama
T. maracayensis Levi, 1964 – Venezuela, Brazil
T. marxi (Crosby, 1906) – USA, Mexico
T. matachic (Levi, 1959) – Mexico
T. melloleitaoni (Bristowe, 1938) – Brazil
T. minero Roth, 1992 – USA
T. minnesota Levi, 1964 – USA, Canada
T. mirus Levi, 1964 – Brazil
T. missionensis (Levi, 1957) – USA to Costa Rica
T. murici Rodrigues & Brescovit, 2015 – Brazil
T. nentwigi Yoshida, 1994 – Indonesia (Krakatau)
T. nevada Müller & Heimer, 1990 – Colombia
T. notabilis (Levi, 1959) – Panama
T. oleatus (L. Koch, 1879) – Canada, Greenland, Russia (Europe to Far East)
T. orilla (Levi, 1959) – Mexico
T. pallidus (Emerton, 1913) – USA, Caribbean to Venezuela
T. palo Levi, 1967 – Brazil
T. peruanus (Keyserling, 1886) – Peru
T. piarco (Levi, 1959) – Trinidad, Brazil
T. pictipes (Banks, 1904) – USA
T. pinheiral Rodrigues & Brescovit, 2015 – Brazil
T. piratini Rodrigues & Brescovit, 2015 – Brazil
T. praemollis (Simon, 1909) – Vietnam
T. prolatus (Levi, 1959) – Panama
T. promatensis Lise & Silva, 2009 – Brazil
T. puer (Mello-Leitão, 1941) – Mexico, Brazil, Argentina
T. ramon Levi, 1964 – Peru
T. ramosus Gao & Li, 2014 – China
T. rarus (Keyserling, 1886) – Brazil
T. reservatus (Levi, 1959) – Panama
T. sanctus (Chamberlin, 1916) – Peru
T. sarasota (Levi, 1957) – USA
T. sclerotis (Levi, 1957) – USA, Mexico
T. simla (Levi, 1959) – Trinidad
T. simplex (Bryant, 1940) – Cuba
T. struthio (Simon, 1895) – Venezuela, Bolivia
T. stylifrons (Simon, 1894) – Panama, Venezuela, St. Vincent
T. subtilis (Simon, 1894) – Tanzania (Zanzibar)
T. tabuleiro Rodrigues & Brescovit, 2015 – Brazil
T. taiobeiras Rodrigues & Brescovit, 2015 – Brazil
T. trisetaceus Peng, Yin & Griswold, 2008 – China
T. ulleungensis (Paik, 1991) – Korea
T. unimaculatus (Emerton, 1882) – USA, Canada
T. unisignatus (Simon, 1894) – Colombia, Venezuela
T. urubamba Levi, 1967 – Peru
T. verus (Levi, 1959) – Mexico
T. villarricaensis Levi, 1964 – Paraguay
T. vivus (O. Pickard-Cambridge, 1899) – Costa Rica
T. wangi Zhu, 1998 – China
T. yaginumai Yoshida, 1995 – Japan

In synonymy:
T. americanus (Simon, 1898, T from Theonoe) = Thymoites luculentus (Simon, 1894)
T. amputatus (Keyserling, 1884) = Thymoites unimaculatus (Emerton, 1882)
T. catalinae (Gertsch & Archer, 1942, T from Theridion) = Thymoites pictipes (Banks, 1904)
T. cubanus (Bryant, 1940, T from Dipoena) = Thymoites pallidus (Emerton, 1913)
T. deprus (Levi, 1959) = Thymoites confraternus (Banks, 1898)
T. edinburgensis (Gertsch & Mulaik, 1936) = Thymoites pallidus (Emerton, 1913)
T. hansi (Schenkel, 1950, T from Theridion) = Thymoites pictipes (Banks, 1904)
T. imparatus (Bishop & Crosby, 1928, T from Theridion) = Thymoites unimaculatus (Emerton, 1882)
T. insignis (O. Pickard-Cambridge, 1897) = Thymoites caracasanus (Simon, 1895)
T. lascivulus (Keyserling, 1886, T from Dipoena) = Thymoites unimaculatus (Emerton, 1882)
T. nicoleti (Keyserling, 1886, T from Theridion) = Thymoites unimaculatus (Emerton, 1882)
T. paradisiacus (Gertsch & Archer, 1942, T from Theridion) = Thymoites unimaculatus (Emerton, 1882)
T. petrensis (Sørensen, 1898, T from Theridion) = Thymoites oleatus (L. Koch, 1879)
T. subimpressus (Zhu, 1998, T from Theridion) = Thymoites bellissimus (L. Koch, 1879)
T. wallacei (Gertsch & Archer, 1942, T from Theridion) = Thymoites pallidus (Emerton, 1913)

See also
 List of Theridiidae species

References

Araneomorphae genera
Spiders of Africa
Spiders of Asia
Spiders of North America
Spiders of South America
Taxa named by Eugen von Keyserling
Theridiidae